Inga Fischer-Hjalmars (née Fischer; 16 January 1918, Stockholm - 17 September 2008, Lidingö) was an internationally acclaimed Swedish physicist, chemist, pharmacist, humanist, and a pioneer in quantum chemistry. She was one of the pioneers in the application of quantum mechanics to solve problems in theoretical chemistry. Fischer-Hjalmars also served as chair of the International Council of Scientific Unions' Standing Committee on the Free Circulation of Scientists.

Biography
Fischer-Hjalmars's parents were civil engineer Otto Fischer and Karen Beate Wulff. She received her bachelor's degree in 1939 (pharmacy), a master's in 1944 (physics, chemistry and mathematics), and continued with postgraduate, receiving her ”licentiat” in mechanics in 1949, and another in chemistry, in 1950. Fischer-Hjalmars was married to mechanical engineering professor Stig Hjalmars.

In 1949, she began work on her doctorate, which she gained in 1952 at Stockholm University, where she became an associate professor of mechanical and mathematical physics. During the period of 1959-63, she also ran a service laboratory in mathematical physics at the Royal Institute of Technology. In 1963, at Stockholm University, Fischer-Hjalmars became Sweden's first female professor of theoretical physics, where she was known as a popular lecturer. She succeeded Oskar Klein in the post and maintained Professorship till 1982. She was affiliated with the International Academy of Quantum Molecular Science (member), Royal Swedish Academy of Sciences (member), Royal Danish Academy of Sciences and Letters (member), World Academy of Art and Sciences (Fellow), and the International Council of Scientific Unions' Standing Committee on the Free Circulation of Scientists (chair).

Awards
 1990, Human Rights of Scientists Award, New York Academy of Sciences

References

Bibliography

Further reading 
 

1918 births
2008 deaths
Scientists from Stockholm
20th-century Swedish physicists
Swedish women physicists
20th-century Swedish chemists
Swedish women chemists
Stockholm University alumni
Academic staff of Stockholm University
Swedish women academics
20th-century Swedish women scientists
Members of the Royal Swedish Academy of Sciences